Leigh is a civil parish in the English county of Staffordshire. The parish includes the village of Church Leigh, together with the settlements of Withington, Upper Leigh, Lower Leigh, Morrilow Heath, Middleton Green, Dods Leigh, Godstone and Field.

The other settlements are within  of Church Leigh.

Transport
Roads
Church Leigh lies 0.8 miles south of the A50 that runs from Warrington to Leicester and is dualled on this section (between Stoke-on-Trent and the M1 motorway).

Rail
The nearest railway station is at Uttoxeter for the Crewe to Derby line on the national network.

Leigh railway station was opened by the North Staffordshire Railway in 1848 and was closed in 1966

Other 
The nearest airport is East Midlands Airport between Derby, Loughborough and Nottingham.

History
Church Leigh has an entry in the Domesday Book of 1086. In the great book Church Leigh is recorded by the name Lege.

The Aston family were the main landowners here in the seventeenth century. They were a junior branch of the prominent Staffordshire family of that name. The senior branch held the Scots title Lord Aston of Forfar.

Notable people 
 Sir William Aston (1613 in Leigh - 1671) a barrister, politician, soldier and a justice of the Court of King's Bench (Ireland).
 Ernald Lane (born 1836) an Anglican priest, Rector of Leigh, then a prebendary of Lichfield Cathedral until 1888 when he became Archdeacon of Stoke; also a fine rower who represented Oxford in the 1858 Boat Race
 Aaron Bell (born 1980) Conservative Member of Parliament (MP) for Newcastle-under-Lyme since 2019 lives in Leigh

Localities
The civil parish of Leigh is centred on the clustered village of Church Leigh but has six satellite hamlets.

Withington
Withington is a linear settlement on five lanes that is separated to the west from Church Leigh by fields covering 300m; its oldest farmhouse is a listed building. Very well known for its pub and Lolo&Jojo.

Upper Leigh
Upper Leigh is a linear settlement on five or six lanes that is separated to the south-east from Lower Leigh by fields covering 100m; it has three listed buildings: Moor Farm, Moor House Farm and Manor Farm.

Lower Leigh
Lower Leigh is on a winding lane, separated from the village Primary School and recreation ground by less than 100 metres, to its north-west.  The middle of the parish's three bridges along the lanes over the River Blithe is close to the centre of Lower Leigh.   Next to this bridge is the aptly-named Brook Farmhouse.

Morrilow Heath
This is the largest hamlet in area and population, and the most remote.  To the south-west, it is on high ground and has a salient boundary as far as the source of the Sprink Brook.

Middleton Green
Birchwood Park, an isolated farm, towards the Sprink Brook was historically a manor of sorts and is an architectural listed building, like the others in the parish which are non-ecclesiastical, at Grade II only. Big Wood, rises to the southern border here with extensive views over the rest of the village

Dods Leigh

Godstone
Just 300m south of Dods Leigh, a traditional manor forms a linear settlement, the traces of which can be made out from the properties, The Orchard, Godstone House and Godstone Cottage, as well as Old Woodcutter, the main four buildings.

Field
Six farms make up a cluster which forms Field; the Sprink Brook discharges to the River Blythe at a point in the south of the hamlet.

See also
Listed buildings in Leigh, Staffordshire

References

External links

Civil parishes in Staffordshire
Borough of East Staffordshire
Villages in Staffordshire